Peter Ernest Arnold Montagnon (24 April 1925 – 27 October 2017) was a British Army officer, operative for the Secret Intelligence Service (MI6), and later a television producer. He was the first head of the BBC's Open University Production Centre. He was married for over fifty years to the influential analytical psychologist, Rosemary Gordon. They retired to France where he died.

Selected television productions
Parliamo Italiano (1963)
Civilisation (1969) (with Michael Gill)
The Roaring Silence (1973)
The Long Search (1977)
The Heart of the Dragon (1985)

References

External links 
Interview at the British Entertainment History Project

English television producers
People from Croydon
People educated at Whitgift School
British Army officers
British Army personnel of World War II
Secret Intelligence Service personnel
1925 births
2017 deaths
Deaths from cerebrovascular disease
BBC people